At the Beeb was a short-lived radio programme that aired from March to April 1999.  There were four half-hour episodes and it was broadcast on BBC Radio 2.  It starred Christien Pritchard as Elaine and Simon Harris as Gareth.

Notes and references
Lavalie, John. At the Beeb. EpGuides. 21 Jul 2005. 29 Jul 2005  <https://web.archive.org/web/20070813234722/http://www.epguides.com/AttheBeeb/%3E.

BBC Radio 2 programmes